The Delinești mine is a large mine in the west of Romania in Caraș-Severin County, 38 km east of Reșița and 448 km west of the capital, Bucharest. Delinești represents one of the largest manganese reserve in Romania having estimated reserves of 7.5 million tonnes of manganese ore grading 20% manganese metal.

References 

Manganese mines in Romania